Bebearia carshena, the shining blue forester, is a butterfly in the family Nymphalidae. It is found in Sierra Leone, Liberia, Ivory Coast, Ghana, Nigeria, Cameroon, Gabon, the Republic of the Congo, the Central African Republic, the Democratic Republic of the Congo (Ubangi, Uele, north Kivu, Tshopo, Equateur and Lualaba), western Uganda and north-western Tanzania. The habitat consists of dense forests.

The larvae feed on Marantochloa species.

References

Butterflies described in 1871
carshena
Butterflies of Africa
Taxa named by William Chapman Hewitson